The pyramid of Neferirkare (Egyptian: Bꜣ Nfr-ỉr-kꜣ-rꜥ "the Ba of Neferirkare") was built for the Fifth Dynasty pharaoh Neferirkare Kakai in the 25th century BC. It was the tallest structure on the highest site at the necropolis of Abusir, found between Giza and Saqqara, and still towers over the necropolis. The pyramid is also significant because its excavation led to the discovery of the Abusir Papyri.

The Fifth Dynasty marked the end of the great pyramid constructions during the Old Kingdom. Pyramids of the era were smaller and becoming more standardized, though intricate relief decoration also proliferated. Neferirkare's pyramid deviated from convention as it was originally built as a step pyramid: a design that had been antiquated after the Third Dynasty (26th or 27th century BC). This was then encased in a second step pyramid with alterations intended to convert it into a true pyramid; However, the pharaoh's death left the work to be completed by his successors. The remaining works were completed in haste, using cheaper building material.

Because of the circumstances, Neferirkare's monument lacked several basic elements of a pyramid complex: a valley temple, a causeway, and a cult pyramid. Instead, these were replaced by a small settlement of mudbrick houses south of the monument from where cult priests could conduct their daily activities, rather than the usual pyramid town near the valley temple. The discovery of the Abusir papyri in the 1890s is owed to this. Normally, the papyrus archives would have been contained in the pyramid town where their destruction would have been assured. The pyramid became part of a greater family cemetery. The monuments to Neferirkare's consort, Khentkaus II; and his sons, Neferefre and Nyuserre Ini, are found in the surrounds. Though their construction began under different rulers, all four of these monuments were completed during the reign of Nyuserre.

Location and excavation 

The pyramid of Neferirkare is situated on the necropolis at Abusir, between Saqqara and the Giza Plateau. Abusir assumed great import in the Fifth Dynasty after Userkaf, the first ruler, built his sun temple and, his successor, Sahure inaugurated a royal necropolis there with his funerary monument. Sahure's successor, his son Neferirkare, was the second ruler to be entombed in the necropolis. The Egyptologist Jaromír Krejčí proposes a number of hypotheses for the position of Neferirkare's complex in relation to Sahure's complex: (1) that Neferirkare was motivated to distance himself from Sahure and thus chose to found a new cemetery and redesign the mortuary temple plan to differentiate it from Sahure's; (2) that geomorphological pressures – particularly the slope between Neferirkare's and Sahure's complexes – required Neferirkare to situate his complex elsewhere; (3) on the basis of the site being the highest point, Neferirkare may have selected it to ensure his complex dominated the surrounding area and; (4) that the site may have been intentionally selected to build the pyramid in line with Heliopolis. The Abusir diagonal is a figurative line connecting the north-west corners of the pyramids of Neferirkare, Sahure and Neferefre. It is similar to the Giza axis, which connects the south-east corners of the Giza pyramids, and converges with the Abusir diagonal to a point in Heliopolis.

The location of the complex affected the construction process. The Egyptologist Miroslav Bárta said the location was chosen partly because of its relation to the administrative capital of the Old Kingdom, Inbu-Hedj known today as Memphis. The benefit of the site being close to the city was the increased access to resources and manpower. South-west of Abusir, workers could exploit a limestone quarry to gather resources for the manufacture of masonry blocks used in the construction of the pyramid.

In 1838, John Shae Perring, an engineer working under Colonel Howard Vyse, cleared the entrances to the pyramids of Sahure, Neferirkare and Nyuserre. Five years later, the Egyptologist Karl Richard Lepsius, sponsored by King Frederick William IV of Prussia, explored the Abusir necropolis and catalogued Neferirkare's pyramid asXXI. It was Lepsius who proposed the theory that the accretion layer method of construction was applied to the pyramids of the Fifth and Sixth Dynasty. One important development was the discovery of the Abusir papyri, found in the temple of Neferirkare during illicit excavations in 1893. In 1902–1908, the Egyptologist Ludwig Borchardt, working for the Deutsche Orient-Gesellschaft or German Oriental Society, resurveyed those same pyramids and had their adjoining temples and causeways excavated. Borchardt's was the first, and only other, major expedition carried out at the Abusir necropolis, and contributed significantly to archaeological investigation at the site. His findings were published in Das Grabdenkmal des Königs Nefer-Ir-Ke-Re (1909). The Czech Institute of Egyptology has had a long-term excavation project going at the site since the 1960s.

Mortuary complex

Layout 

Pyramid construction techniques underwent a transition in the Fifth Dynasty. The monumentality of the pyramids diminished, the design of mortuary temples changed, and the substructure of the pyramid became standardized. By contrast, relief decoration proliferated and the temples were enriched with greater storeroom complexes.

These two conceptual changes had developed by the time of Sahure's reign at the latest. Sahure's mortuary complex indicates that symbolic expression through decoration became favoured over sheer magnitude. For example, Fourth Dynasty pharaoh Khufu's complex had a total of 100 linear metres (330 linear feet) reserved for decoration, while Sahure's temple had around 370 linear metres (1,200 linear feet) dedicated to relief decorations. Bárta identifies that storage space in mortuary temples expanded consistently from Neferirkare's reign onwards. This was a result of the combined centralization of administrative focus onto the funerary cult, the increase in the numbers of priests and officials involved in the maintenance of the cult, and the increase in their revenues. The discovery of considerable remains of stone vessels – mostly broken or otherwise incomplete – in the pyramid temples of Sahure, Neferirkare, and Neferefre bears testament to this development.

Old Kingdom mortuary complexes consisted of five essential components: (1) a valley temple; (2) a causeway; (3) a mortuary temple; (4) a cult pyramid; and (5) the main pyramid. Neferirkare's mortuary complex had only two of these basic elements: a mortuary temple which had been hastily constructed from cheap mudbrick and wood; and the largest main pyramid at the site. The valley temple and causeway that were originally intended for Neferirkare's monument were co-opted by Nyuserre for his own mortuary complex. Conversely, a cult pyramid never entered construction, as a consequence of the rush to complete the monument upon Neferirkare's death. Its replacement was a small settlement and lodgings constructed from mudbrick to the south of the complex where the priests would live. An enormous brick enclosure wall was built around the perimeter of the pyramid and mortuary temple to complete Neferirkare's funerary monument.

Main pyramid 

The monument was intended as a step pyramid, an unusual choice for a Fifth Dynasty king, given that the era of step pyramids ended with the Third Dynasty (26th or 27th century BC) centuries prior, depending on the scholar and source. The reasoning behind this choice is not understood. The Egyptologist Miroslav Verner considers a speculative connection between the Turin Canon's listing him "as the founder of a new dynasty" and the original project, though he also considers the possibility of religious reasons and power politics as well. A white limestone casing was to be applied to the structure, but after minimal work on this was completed – extending only to the first step – the pyramid was redesigned to form a "true pyramid". Verner describes the architecture of a Fifth Dynasty pyramid:

This expansion project was completed in rough order with small stone fragments intended to be cased in red granite. The premature death of the king halted the project after only the lowest level(s) of the casing had been completed.

Substructure 

The descending corridor near the middle of the north face of the pyramid serves as the entry into the substructure of Neferirkare's pyramid. It has proportions of  height and  width. It is reinforced at the entrance and exit points with granite casing. The corridor breaks out into a vestibule leading to a longer corridor which is guarded by a portcullis. This second corridor has two turns, but maintains a generally eastward direction and ends in an antechamber offset from the burial chamber. The roof of the corridor is unique: the flat roof has a second gabled roof made of limestone on top of it which itself has a third roof made from a layer of reeds.

The burial and ante chamber's ceilings were constructed with three gabled layers of limestone. The beams disperse weight from the superstructure onto either side of the passageway, preventing collapse. Thieves have ransacked the chambers of its limestone making it impossible to properly reconstruct, though some details can still be discerned. Namely, that (1) both rooms were oriented along an east–west axis, (2) both chambers were the same width; the antechamber was shorter of the two, and (3) both chambers had the same style roof, and are missing one layer of limestone.

Overall, the substructure is badly damaged: the collapse of a layer of the limestone beams has covered the burial chamber. No trace of the mummy, sarcophagus, or any burial equipment has been found inside. The severity of the damage to the substructure prevents further excavation.

Mortuary temple 

The mortuary temple is located at the base of the pyramid's Eastern face. It is larger than is typical for the period. Archaeological evidence suggests that it was unfinished at Neferirkare's death, and was completed by Neferefre and Nyuserre. For example, while the inner temple and statue niches were built from stone, much of the rest of the temple, including the court and entrance hall, was apparently hastily completed using cheap mudbrick and wood. This left large portions of the mortuary temple susceptible to erosion from rain and wind, where stone would have given it significant durability. The site was less aesthetically impressive, although its basic layout and features remained roughly analogous to Sahure's temple. Its enlarged size can be attributed to a design decision to build the complex without a valley temple or a causeway. Instead, the causeway and temple, whose foundations had been constructed, were diverted to Nyuserre's complex.

The temple was entered through the columned portico, and columned entrance hall which terminates into a large columned courtyard. The columns of the hall and courtyard are made from wood arranged into the form of lotus stalks and buds. The courtyard is adorned with thirty-seven such columns; these columns are asymmetrically positioned. The archaeologist Herbert Ricke hypothesized that columns near the altar may have been damaged by fire and removed. A papyrus fragment from the temple archives corroborates this story. A low stepped ramp in the courtyard's west leads to a transverse (north–south) corridor which leads south into storerooms and north into another smaller corridor containing six wooden columns through which the open courtyard of the main pyramid can be accessed. It is in the southern storerooms that the Abusir papyri were discovered by graverobbers in the 1890s. Beyond the storerooms is a gate which has another access point to the main pyramid's courtyard, and through which a second excavated south-western gate leads to KhentkausII's complex. Finally, traversing across the corridor leads directly into the inner sanctuary or temple.

The surviving reliefs are fragmentary. Of the preserved materials, one particular block stands out as vitally important in reconstructing the genealogy of the royal family at this time. A limestone block, discovered in the 1930s by the Egyptologist Édouard Ghazouli, depicts Neferirkare with his consort, Khentkaus II, and eldest son, Neferefre. It was not found at the site of the pyramid, but as a part of a house in the village of Abusir.

The Abusir papyri document details concerning Neferirkare's mortuary temple at Abusir. One testimony from the papyri is that five statues were housed in the niches of the central chapel. The central statue depicted Neferirkare as the deity Osiris, whereas the two outermost statues portrayed him as the king of Upper and Lower Egypt respectively. The papyri also record the existence of at least four funerary boats at Abusir. Two boats are located in sealed rooms while the other two are to the north and south of the pyramid itself. The southern boat was discovered when Verner unearthed the funerary boat during excavations.

Valley temple, causeway and cult pyramid 

At the time of Neferirkare's death, only the foundations of the valley temple and two-thirds of the causeway to the mortuary temple had been laid. When Nyuserre took over the site, he had the causeway diverted from its original destination to his own mortuary temple. As such, the causeway travels in one direction for more than half its distance, then bends away to another for the remainder of its length.

Neferirkare's monument has no cult pyramid. Rather, the cult pyramid was replaced with a small settlement, called Ba Kakai, of mudbrick lodgings for priests, south of the monument.

The omission of these "essential" elements had one significant impact. Under normal circumstances, the priests tending to the deceased pharaoh's funerary cult would have lived in a 'pyramid town' built in the vicinity of the valley temple, situated on the Abusir Lake. The daily records of the administration would have had their residence in the town with the priests. Instead, as a result of circumstance, these documents were instead kept inside the mortuary temple. This has allowed their archives to be preserved, as they would have otherwise long ago disintegrated, buried under the mud. The siting of the settlement by the complex also allowed small restorative works to be conducted.

Later history 

Nyuserre was the last king to build his funerary monument at Abusir; his successors Menkauhor and Djedkare Isesi chose sites elsewhere, and Abusir ceased to be the royal necropolis. But the site was not abandoned. The Abusir Papyri demonstrate that funerary cults remained active at Abusir at least until the reign of Pepi II at the end of the Sixth Dynasty. Priests who served Neferirkare include Kaemnefret, priest of Neferirkare's pyramid and sun temple and of Sahure's pyramid; Nimaatptah, priest in the pyramid and sun temple of Neferirkare; Kuyemsnewy and Kamesenu, priests of the cults of Sahure, Neferirkare, and Nyuserre; Nimaatsed, priest of the pyramids of Neferirkare, Neferefre, and Nyuserre; Khabauptah, priest of Sahure, Neferirkare, Neferefre, and Nyuserre Ini.

Verner believes that royal cultic activities ceased by the First Intermediate Period. Málek notes that some limited evidence for the persistence of the cults of Neferirkare and Nyuserre throughout the Herakleopolitan Period exists, though this means Nyuserre's cult operated continuously until at least the Twelfth Dynasty. Professor Antonio Morales believes funerary cults may have continued beyond the Old Kingdom, in particular the cult of Nyuserre appears to have survived both in its official form and in popular public veneration until the early Middle Kingdom, and some scant evidence in the form of two statues dated to the Middle Kingdom may suggest that Neferirkare's cult was active during that period as well.

The necropoleis near Memphis, specifically those at Saqqara and Abusir, were used extensively during the Twenty-Sixth Dynasty (c. 664–525 BC). Considerable quantities of stone were required to build these tombs, and this was very probably sourced from the Old Kingdom pyramids, thereby inflicting further damage to them. Graves estimated to be from the fifth century BC have been discovered in the vicinity of Neferirkare's mortuary temple. One yellow calcite gravestone, discovered by Borchardt, bears an Aramaic inscription: "(Belonging) to Nsnw, the daughter of Paḥnûm" alternatively read as "(Belonging) to Nesneu, the daughter of Tapakhnum". A second inscription, found by Verner on a limestone block in the mortuary temple bears the inscription: "Mannu-ki-na'an son of Šewa". The dating of this second inscription is uncertain, but may plausibly be from the same period.

Family cemetery

Pyramid of Khentkhaus II 

Borchardt initially thought a ruined structure on the southern side of Neferirkare's complex to be an unimportant mastaba, and surveyed it only briefly. In the 1970s, Verner's Czech team identified it as the pyramid tomb of Neferirkare's consort, KhentkausII. Perring had previously discovered griffonage on a limestone block from the site of Neferirkare's tomb which mentioned "the King's wife Khentkawes". She also appeared in a relief of the royal family on another limestone block on which Neferirkare's son, Neferefre, also appears.

Khentkhaus's pyramid was built in two phases. The first must have begun during Neferirkare's reign, as is evidenced by the inscription Perring discovered. The project was halted around the tenth year of Neferirkare's reign. Verner suggested Neferirkare's untimely death interrupted the project and that it was finished during Nyuserre's reign. The word "mother" appears inscribed above "wife" on another block indicating that the relationship between Khentkaus II and Nyuserre was as mother and son. Her mortuary complex also includes a satellite pyramid, a courtyard, and an extended mortuary temple.

Unfinished pyramid (Neferefre) 

Located directly south-west of Neferirkare's monument, and just to the west of KhentkausII's, Neferefre's unfinished pyramid is another member of the family cemetery born around Neferirkare's tomb. Built on the Abusir diagonal, Neferefre's pyramid was never completed owing to the unexpectedly early death of the pharaoh. For this reason, the pyramid was hastily converted into a squared mastaba and completed with the application of limestone facing at a slope of 78° and a clay and desert stone capping. The accompanying mortuary temple is believed to have been built promptly following Neferefre's death. The main features of the temple were a hypostyle hall, two large wooden boats, and a number of broken statues found in rooms near the aforementioned hall.

Nyuserre's pyramid 

Nyuserre joined the family cemetery with his mortuary complex, and was the last king to be interred in the Abusir necropolis. Upon taking the throne, Nyuserre undertook to complete the three unfinished monuments of his closest family members: his father, Neferirkare; his mother, KhentkausII; and his brother, Neferefre. The costs of this project burdened the construction of his own monument, which manifested itself in the siting of the complex.

Instead of being seated on the Abusir-Heliopolis axis, Nyuserre's complex is nestled between Neferirkare's and Sahure's pyramids. Respecting the axis would have meant placing the complex south-west of Neferefre's unfinished pyramid, and far from the Nile valley. The expense would have been unreasonable.

The causeway connecting the valley temple to the mortuary complex was originally intended for Neferirkare's pyramid, but Nyuserre had these diverted, to serve his monument.

Abusir papyri 

The monument's significance comes from the circumstances of its construction, and the contents of the Abusir papyri archives. The Egyptologist Nicolas Grimal says that "this was the most important known collection of papyri from the Old Kingdom until the 1982 expedition of the Egyptological Institute of the University of Prague discovered an even richer cache in a storeroom of the nearby mortuary temple of Neferefre."

The first fragments of the Abusir papyri were discovered by illicit diggers in 1893, and sold and distributed around the world in the antiquities market. Later, Borchardt discovered additional fragments while excavating in the same area. The fragments were found to be written in hieratic; a cursive form of hieroglyphics. Other papyri found in Neferirkare's tomb were comprehensively studied and published by the Egyptologist Paule Posener-Kriéger.

The papyri records span the period between the reign of Djedkare Isesi through to the reign of PepiII. They recount all aspects of the management of the funerary cult of the king including the daily activities of priests, lists of offerings, letters, and inventory checks of the temple. Importantly, the papyri connect the larger picture of the interplay between the mortuary temple, sun temple and other institutions. For example, the fragmentary evidence of the papyri indicates that goods for Neferirkare's funerary cult were transported by ship to the pyramid complex of the king. The full extent of the records of the papyri found at Abusir is unknown as more recent findings remain unpublished.

See also 
 List of Egyptian pyramids

Notes

References

Sources 

 
 
 
 
 
 
 
 
 
 
 
 
 
 
 
 
 
 
 
 
 
 
 
 
 
 
 
 
 
 
 
 
 
 
 
 
 
 
 
 
 
 
 
 
 
 
 
 
 
 

Buildings and structures completed in the 25th century BC
Abusir
Pyramids of the Fifth Dynasty of Egypt
Neferirkare Kakai
Ancient Egyptian step pyramids
1902 archaeological discoveries